The 2014–15 Central Connecticut Blue Devils men's basketball team represented Central Connecticut State University during the 2014–15 NCAA Division I men's basketball season. The Blue Devils, led by 19th year head coach Howie Dickenman, played their home games at the William H. Detrick Gymnasium and were members of the Northeast Conference. They finished the season 5–26, 3–15 in NEC play to finish in a tie for ninth place. They failed to qualify for the NEC Tournament.

Roster

Schedule

|-
!colspan=9 style="background:#1F24B4; color:#C0C0C0;"| Regular season

References

Central Connecticut Blue Devils men's basketball seasons
Central Connecticut
Central Connecticut Blue Devils
Central Connecticut Blue Devils